Les Plus Beaux Villages de France (meaning “the most beautiful villages of France”) is an independent association created in 1982 for the promotion of the tourist appeal of small rural villages with a rich cultural heritage. As of September 2016, it numbers 156 member villages (independent communes or part of a communauté de communes).

Membership requires meeting certain selection criteria and offers a strategy for development and promotion to tourists. The three initial selection criteria are the rural nature of the village (a population of less than 2,000 inhabitants), the presence of at least two national heritage sites (sites classés or monuments historiques) and local support in the form of a vote by the council. Each village must pay an annual fee to the association and the mayor must sign the association's Quality Charter. If the village fails to meet the requirements of the charter it may be excluded.

The association claims membership can bring a rise of between 10 and 50% in visitor numbers.

The southern departments of the Dordogne and Aveyron have the most number of member villages, with ten in each. They are followed by Vaucluse, with seven, and Lot, with six.

Following the success of the French certification, similar associations have been formed in Wallonia (Les Plus Beaux Villages de Wallonie), Quebec (Les Plus Beaux Villages du Québec), Italy (I Borghi più belli d’Italia), Japan (日本で最も美しい村」連合 Nihon de mottomo utsukushii mura rengō), Spain (Los pueblos más bonitos de España), Russia (Самые красивые деревни России), and Switzerland and Liechtenstein (Les plus beaux villages de Suisse).

History

The idea of an association to gather the most beautiful villages of France was born in Collonges-la-Rouge, Corrèze in 1981. Charles Ceyrac, mayor of the village, was inspired by a Reader's Digest book entitled Les Plus Beaux Villages de France which included pictures of Collonges. He decided to launch an association that would unite villages to give them a public face and revitalise their economies. He wrote to the mayors of one hundred villages included in the book, advising them of his plans. Sixty-six mayors responded and the association was officially founded on 6 March 1982 at Salers, Cantal.

Charles Ceyrac remained the president of the association until 1996, when he was succeeded by Maurice Chabert, mayor of Gordes, Vaucluse, who is the current president. The association is still situated in Collonges-la-Rouge.

The association and its certification have been very successful. Many competing certifications exist in France, differentiated by their targets (e.g. level of population), stringency of criteria and the cost of membership.

The association has four employees and an annual budget of €479,000. An application, as well as each six-yearly review, requires evaluation by the Quality Committee at the cost of €800 plus €0.50 per inhabitant. Each member village contributes an annual fee calculated at the rate of three euros per inhabitant.

Since 2000, the president of the association has had a seat on the Conseil national du tourisme (National Tourist Board).

Since 7 July 2012, Les Plus Beaux Villages de France has been part of the international association Les Plus Beaux Villages de la Terre ("The Most Beautiful Villages of the World").

Principles
The association was set up to help villages promoting their touristic potentials. It specifically targets villages that are sometimes neglected by wider regional or national touristic strategies. The association believes in improving life in French countryside and it places an emphasis on bringing back economical activities to villages. Most of the labelled villages are in regions that greatly suffer from rural flight. Many villages can be considered dead when most of their houses are either in ruins or transformed into holiday properties by foreigners or French people living in other regions. The association does not promote or encourage open-air museums and other museum-villages.

One of the major principles of the association is the protection of the historical and cultural heritage. Labelled villages must show a real strategy to preserve and promote their heritage. The association encourages environmentally friendly tourism, for instance by encouraging tailor-made breaks rather than mere passing trade.

Criteria

The association asks candidate municipalities to fill out an application form for the village or hamlet they wish to see receive the label. The locality must have a rural character with no more than 2,000 inhabitants and it must include two national heritage sites and their protection perimeter. The municipality must show real interest and the local council must have deliberated on the application.

After the form is returned to the association, it sends experts to evaluate the application. They create a record of pictures and documents about the locality and consider its appearance (architecture, urbanism, facilities for welcoming tourists, environment quality). The dossier is then given to a commission who decides if the village receives the label or not. If it is successful, the municipality must sign a quality charter.

List

Alsace

Bas-Rhin
Hunspach pop. 684
Mittelbergheim pop. 605
Haut-Rhin
Eguisheim pop. 1572
Hunawihr pop. 611
Riquewihr pop. 1300

Aquitaine

Dordogne
Belvès
Beynac-et-Cazenac
Castelnaud-la-Chapelle
Domme
La Roque-Gageac
Limeuil
Monpazier
Saint-Amand-de-Coly
Saint-Jean-de-Côle
Saint-Léon-sur-Vézère
Lot-et-Garonne
Monflanquin
Pujols-le-Haut (commune of Pujols)
Pyrénées-Atlantiques
Ainhoa
La Bastide-Clairence
Navarrenx
Sare

Auvergne
Allier
Charroux
Cantal

Salers
Tournemire
Haute-Loire
Arlempdes
Blesle
Lavaudieu
Pradelles
Puy-de-Dôme
Montpeyroux
Saint-Floret
Saint-Saturnin
Usson

Brittany

Côtes d'Armor
Moncontour
Finistère
Locronan
Ille-et-Vilaine
Saint-Suliac
Morbihan
Rochefort-en-Terre

Burgundy
Côte-d'Or

Châteauneuf-en-Auxois
Flavigny-sur-Ozerain
Saône-et-Loire
Semur-en-Brionnais
Yonne
Noyers
Vézelay

Centre

Cher
Apremont-sur-Allier
Indre
Gargilesse-Dampierre
Saint-Benoît-du-Sault
Indre-et-Loire
Candes-Saint-Martin
Crissay-sur-Manse
Montrésor
Loir-et-Cher
Lavardin
Loiret
Yèvre-le-Châtel (in Yèvre-la-Ville)

Champagne-Ardenne
No village labelled

Corsica

Corse-du-Sud
Piana
Haute-Corse
Sant'Antonino

Franche-Comté

Doubs
Lods
Haute-Saône
Pesmes
Jura
Baume-les-Messieurs
Château-Chalon

Île-de-France
Val-d'Oise
La Roche-Guyon
Barbizon

Languedoc-Roussillon

Aude
Lagrasse
Gard
Aiguèze
La Roque-sur-Cèze
Hérault
Minerve
Olargues
Saint-Guilhem-le-Désert
Lozère
La Garde-Guérin (commune of Prévenchères)
Sainte-Enimie
Pyrénées-Orientales
Castelnou
Eus
Évol (commune of Olette-Évol)
Mosset
Villefranche-de-Conflent

Limousin

Corrèze
Collonges-la-Rouge
Curemonte
Saint-Robert
Ségur-le-Château
Treignac
Turenne
Haute-Vienne
Mortemart

Lorraine

Moselle
Rodemack pop. 804
Saint-Quirin pop. 873

Lower Normandy 

Calvados
Beuvron-en-Auge
Manche
Barfleur
Orne
Saint-Céneri-le-Gérei

Midi-Pyrénées

Ariège
Camon
Saint-Lizier
Aveyron
Belcastel
Brousse-le-Château
Conques
La Couvertoirade
Estaing
Najac
Peyre (commune of Comprégnac)
Saint-Côme-d'Olt
Sainte-Eulalie-d'Olt
Sauveterre-de-Rouergue
Haute-Garonne
Saint-Bertrand-de-Comminges
Gers
Fourcès
Larressingle
Montréal-du-Gers
Sarrant
Lot
Autoire
Capdenac
Cardaillac
Carennac
Loubressac
Saint-Cirq-Lapopie
Tarn
Castelnau-de-Montmiral
Lautrec
Monestiés
Puycelci-Grésigne
Tarn-et-Garonne
Auvillar
Bruniquel
Lauzerte

Nord-Pas-de-Calais

Cassel

Pays de la Loire

Maine-et-Loire
Montsoreau
Mayenne
Sainte-Suzanne, Mayenne
Vendée
Vouvant

Picardy

Aisne
Parfondeval
Oise
Gerberoy

Poitou-Charentes

Charente
Aubeterre-sur-Dronne
Charente-Maritime
Ars-en-Ré
La Flotte-en-Ré
Mornac-sur-Seudre
Talmont-sur-Gironde
Deux-Sèvres
Coulon
Vienne
Angles-sur-l'Anglin

Provence-Alpes-Côte d'Azur 

Alpes-de-Haute-Provence
Moustiers-Sainte-Marie
Alpes-Maritimes
Coaraze
Gourdon
Sainte-Agnès
Bouches-du-Rhône
Les Baux-de-Provence
Hautes-Alpes
La Grave-la-Meije
Saint-Véran
Var
Bargème
Gassin
Seillans
Tourtour
Vaucluse
Ansouis
Gordes
Lourmarin
Ménerbes
Roussillon
Séguret
Venasque

Rhône-Alpes

Ain
Pérouges
Ardèche
Balazuc
Vogüé
Drôme
Grignan
La Garde-Adhémar
Mirmande
Montbrun-les-Bains
Le Poët-Laval
Haute-Savoie
Sixt-Fer-à-Cheval
Yvoire
Isère
Saint-Antoine-l'Abbaye
Loire
Sainte-Croix-en-Jarez
Rhône
Oingt
Savoie
Bonneval-sur-Arc

Upper Normandy

Eure
Le Bec-Hellouin
Lyons-la-Forêt

Overseas departments and territories of France
Réunion
Hell-Bourg (commune of Salazie)

See also
 Tourism in France
 French Towns and Lands of Art and History

References

External links

 Website of the association (French)

Tourism in France
 
1982 establishments in France
Organizations established in 1982
Lists of most beautiful villages